Martin Cassini is a TV programme-maker and campaigner for traffic system reform. He advocates replacing priority (an engineering model) with equality (a social model) to provide a level playing-field on which all road-users can act sociably. This, he says, would remove the "need" for most traffic controls, and solve many of our road safety and congestion problems, which stem from those very controls.

Cassini has contributed to Economic Affairs (journal of the Institute of Economic Affairs), The Times, Guardian, Daily Telegraph, BBC Newsnight and Traffic Technology International.

Cassini's reforms overlap with the shared space movement of Hans Monderman and Ben Hamilton-Baillie, which is demonstrating in Bohmte and Drachten that peaceful coexistence can flourish when road-users are free to use their own judgement on roads designed to stimulate rather than enforce appropriate conduct. His ideas also echo the theory of spontaneous order, which states that the more complex the dance of human movement (e.g. a skateboard park), the less useful are attempts to control it.

Cassini helped instigate a lights-off trial in Portishead, Somerset, which began on 14 September 2009. Conducted in association with North Somerset Council and Colin Buchanan, it went permanent after journey times fell by over 50% with no loss of pedestrian safety, despite greater numbers now using the route (over 2000 vehicles and 300 pedestrians an hour). 
Minor trials took place in Westminster, Oxford, and Bristol in 2009. But deregulation is not enough on its own, says Cassini. It needs to be accompanied by changes in road design, culture, the driving test and the law.

Cassini is a member of the International Advisory Council of the Kyoto World Cities New Mobility Program.

Publications

Articles and references 

ref></ref>

Further reading
 
 
 
 
 * Whole article Buchanan report
 In Pursuit of Elegance by Matthew May, Broadway Books (Crown Publishing Group, division of Random House, New York), 2009
 
 Shropshire Star 
 Bristol Evening Post 15 Sept 2009 
 Southwest Business

External links
  Colin Buchanan -"The effect of removing traffic control regulations at road junctions in the UK"
  SSRN Author Page

Living people
English documentary filmmakers
English columnists
1947 births
People from Shepperton